The Collation of the New Testament (Latin: Collatio Novi Testamenti) is a 1447 work composed by the Italian humanist Lorenzo Valla (c. 1407–1457). The Collation of the New Testament compares four Latin texts of Jerome’s fourth-century Vulgate Bible with four Greek manuscripts of the New Testament. Valla designated the Greek text the Graeca veritas or "Greek truth", that is the truth of the original Greek.

Background

The Vulgate had become the predominant Bible translation by 800 AD and thousands of handwritten copies of the text were circulated throughout Europe; however, these were produced with numerous errors despite efforts made by medieval scholars to correct the text. Previous to Valla's work, medieval scholars such as Roger Bacon and Nicholas of Lyra had completed similar scriptural comparisons and advocated study of the Bible's original Hebrew and Greek text. The revival of Greek studies in Western Europe and the Vulgate's prominence in the cultural milieu of the continent and its status as the authoritative version of the Bible made it an especially desirable work for humanists to critically examine.

Overview

The Collation of the New Testament was Valla's first comparative study of the original Greek New Testament and the Vulgate, with his Annotations of the New Testament being a subsequent though ultimately uncompleted project he dedicated himself to during the mid-1450s; by the end of his life, Valla had completed approximately 2,000 notes on the New Testament. Valla employed humanist philological methods to compare the texts, including favouring the ad sententiam approach against the older medieval ad verbum convention; the former approach critically assessed a word's history and development while the latter convention freely translated between Greek and Latin on a word-for-word basis. By examining the Vulgate's style, vocabulary, and grammar, Valla was able to draw out faulty translations that had obscured the Latin Bible's meaning and other erratum due to copier error. For instance, Valla challenged the Vulgate's translation of the Greek word μετάνοια as "penance" rather than "repentance" and also contended that Jerome had not translated the Vulgate.

Valla's analysis of the Vulgate led to criticisms from his fellow humanist Poggio Braccciolini who objected to his tampering with the authoritative Latin text but Valla's work was commended by Cardinal Basilios Bessarion and Nicholas of Cusa. In response to Bracciolini's criticisms Valla responded:"if I am correcting anything, I am not correcting Sacred Scripture, but rather its translation, and in doing so I am not being insolent toward scripture but rather pious, and I am doing nothing more than translating better than the earlier translator, so that it is my translation—should it be correct—that ought to be called Sacred Scripture, not his." Valla, like other philologists, thus saw his efforts to assess the accuracy of the Vulgate as an act of service to theology. Although Valla’s work was limited, it nevertheless represents one of the first attempts to comprehensively collate and evaluate the variants present between Greek manuscripts of the New Testament and the Vulgate.

Influence

Valla’s Collation of the New Testament is perhaps most significant for being a major influence on the Dutch Christian humanist Desiderius Erasmus of Rotterdam (1466-1536), who came across Valla’s work in mid-1504 in a library near Louvain and who subsequently published Valla's previously-unreleased collation the next year. Valla's collation helped to convince Erasmus that there was an interest in a new translation of the New Testament and Erasmus would write his own translation, drawing upon the scholarship of Valla, which he released in 1516. Other scholars influenced by Valla include the group gathered by Cardinal Francisco Jiménez de Cisneros at Alcalá who worked on the Complutensian Polyglot Bible in the early 1500s.

References 

New Testament
Vulgate
Bible versions and translations